is a Shinto shrine located in the town of Tarui in Fuwa District, Gifu Prefecture, Japan. It is the ichinomiya of former Mino Province. The main festival of the shrine is held annually on  May 25. The shrine precincts contain 18 structures from the Edo period, which are designated national Important Cultural Properties. The main building of the shrine is rebuilt every 51 years.

Enshrined kami
The kami enshrined at Nangū Taisha is:
 , the kami of mining and the metals industry.
Beppyo shrines

History
Nangū Taisha is located in the southwestern corner of Gifu Prefecture, at the foot of Mount Nangū. The name "Nangū" derives from its location to the south of the ancient Mino Provincial Capital. Nangū Taisha claims to have been first built during the reign of the legendary Emperor Sujin (97 BC – 30 BC), although there are no historical records prior to its mention in the 836 Shoku Nihon Kōki and in the 859 Nihon Sandai Jitsuroku. The shrine was destroyed by a fire in 1501, which destroyed all its records. It was rebuilt by Toki Masafusa, the shugo of Mino Province in 1511. 

During the nearby Battle of Sekigahara in 1600, the shrine was again completely burnt to the ground and was not rebuilt until 1642, when Shogun Tokugawa Iemitsu sponsored the construction efforts. The shrine retains a document which details the cost of the reconstruction. In 1867, as a result of shinbutsu bunri, the Buddhist temple located on the shrine grounds was moved to a different location and named Shinzen-in (真禅院). In 1871, the shrine was designated as a  under the Modern system of ranked Shinto shrines of State Shinto.

The shrine is located approximately one kilometer southwest of Tarui Station on the JR Tokai Tōkaidō Main Line.

Gallery

Cultural Properties

Important Cultural Properties
 Honden (Main shrine), built in 1642. 
 Heiden, built in 1642.
 Haiden, built in 1642.
 Cloister, built in 1642. 
 Chokushi-den, built in 1642.
 Kobu-den, built in 1642.
, built in 1642.
, built in 1642.
, built in 1642.
 Sub-shrine Juge Jinja Honden
 Sub-shrine Takayama Jinja Honden
Sub-shrine Hayato Jinja Honden 
 Sub-shrine Nandai Jinja Honden
 Sub-shrine Shichi-ōji Jinja Honden  
 Stone Torii, built in 1642 and located in Tarui-juku, built in 1642.
, built in 1642.
, built in 1642.
 Tachi, signed Yasumitsu, donated by Toki Yoriyoshi in 1398
 Tachi, Heian period, signed by Munechika Sanjo
 Halberd (2 pcs), Nara period

 Historical documents of Nangū Taisha (623 volumes)

See also
 List of Shinto shrines
 Ichinomiya

Notes

External links

Official home page

Shinto shrines in Gifu Prefecture
Tarui, Gifu
Mino Province
Important Cultural Properties of Japan
Ichinomiya